Sara Thydén (born 26 June 1989) is a Swedish swimmer from Kalmar, representing Kalmar SS. She is the Swedish Junior Record holder in 200 m individual medley. She finished 5th in 400 m IM at the 2005 European Junior Championships.

Clubs
Kalmar SS

References

1989 births
Living people
People from Kalmar
Swedish female freestyle swimmers
Sportspeople from Kalmar County
21st-century Swedish women